Gomelevka is a rural locality (a selo) in Malinovsky Selsoviet of Bureysky District, Amur Oblast, Russia. The population was 2 as of 2018. There are 3 streets.

Geography 
Gomelevka is located on the right bank of the Bureya River, 21 km southwest of Novobureysky (the district's administrative centre) by road. Ust-Kivda is the nearest rural locality.

References 

Rural localities in Bureysky District